Harivansh Singh is an Indian politician and a member of the Apna Dal; and has won the 2014 Indian general elections from the Pratapgarh (Lok Sabha constituency).

Early life and education 
He hails from Jaunpur, Uttar Pradesh.
He has a B.Sc. from T.D. College, Jaunpur, Gorakhpur University, Gorakhpur. He married Indravati Singh on 20 March 1962.

Career 
He is a business man from Mumbai. Kunwar Haribansh Singh was elected to 16th Lok Sabha of Indian Parliament on 16 May 2014 from Pratapgarh (Lok Sabha constituency), Uttar Pradesh.

Social and Cultural Activities: Arranged group wedding of poor girls at own cost; financial support for sick people through Smt. Sonpatti Devi Memorial Medical Trust.National President : Akhil Bharatiya Kshatriya Mahasabha.

References

Living people
India MPs 2014–2019
Lok Sabha members from Uttar Pradesh
People from Pratapgarh district, Uttar Pradesh
People from Jaunpur, Uttar Pradesh
Apna Dal politicians
1950 births
Apna Dal (Sonelal) politicians